The Eastern Mindanao Command (abbrv. as EASTMINCOM) is the Armed Forces of the Philippines' unified command in charge of the Davao, Soccsksargen, and Caraga regions. It is responsible for the defense of these areas against external aggresion, as well as combating terrorism and insurgency. It is also one of the government organizations advocating the "Culture of Peace" in Mindanao.

Organization
The following are the units that are under the Eastern Mindanao Command.
 Joint Task Force Haribon (Strike to Protect), EASTMINCOM, AFP (JTFH)
 Military Intelligence Group 11, ISAFP
 Military Intelligence Group 16, ISAFP
 5th Civil Relations Group, AFP
 4th Infantry Division, PA
 10th Infantry Division, PA
 52nd Engineer Brigade, PA
 Naval Forces Eastern Mindanao, PN
 Tactical Operations Wing Eastern Mindanao, PAF
 Tactical Operations Group 10, PAF
 Tactical Operations Group 11, PAF
 Joint Reserve Task Force - Metro Davao (JRTF-Metro Davao), AFP
 22nd Infantry Division (Ready Reserve), PA
 10th Regional Community Defense Group, ARESCOM
 11th Regional Community Defense Group, ARESCOM
 12th Regional Community Defense Group, ARESCOM
 15th Regional Community Defense Group, ARESCOM
 5th Air Reserve Center, PAF
 7th Air Reserve Center, PAF
 Naval Reserve Center Eastern Mindanao, PN

Operations
 Peace and Development Outreach in Communities to enlighten the people about NPA Propaganda Units' deception and exploitation
 Protect the Peace Process
 Humanitarian Assistance and Disaster Response Operations

Lineage of Commander
 LtGen. Rodolfo S. Obaniana AFP (28 August 2006 – 31 August 2007)
 LtGen. Cardozo M. Luna AFP (31 August 2007 – 7 May 2008)
 MGen. Armando L. Cunanan AFP (7 May 2008 – 21 January 2009)
 LtGen. Raymundo B. Ferrer AFP (21 January 2009 – 18 November 2010)
 LtGen. Arthur I. Tabaquero AFP (18 November 2010 – 17 April 2012)
 LtGen. Jorge V. Segovia AFP (17 April 2012 – 23 April 2013)
 LtGen. Ricardo Ranier G. Cruz III AFP (23 April 2013 – 5 September 2014)
 LtGen. Aurelio B. Baladad  AFP (5 September 2014 – 21 November 2015)
 LtGen. Rey Leonardo B. Guerrero AFP (21 November 2015 – 26 October 2017)
 BGen. Perfecto M. Rimando Jr. AFP (26 October 2017 – 15 November 2017) (acting)
 LtGen. Benjamin R. Madrigal AFP (15 November 2017 – 11 December 2018)
 MGen. Ronald C. Villanueva AFP (11 December 2018 – 21 January 2019) (acting)
 LtGen. Felimon T. Santos Jr. AFP (21 January 2019 – 4 January 2020)
 BGen. Alfredo V. Rosario Jr. (4 January 2020 – 25 January 2020) (acting)
 LtGen. Jose C. Faustino Jr. AFP (25 January 2020 – 8 March 2021)
 LtGen. Greg T. Almerol AFP (8 March 2021 – Present)

References

External links
EastMinCom Facebook

Regional commands of the Philippines
Davao City
Military units and formations established in 2006